Giaquinta is a surname. Notable people with the surname include:

 Alberico Giaquinta (died 1548), Italian Roman Catholic bishop
 Carmelo Giaquinta (1930–2011), Argentine bishop
 Mariano Giaquinta (born 1947), Italian mathematician

See also
 Giaquinto